ARA Canal Beagle (B-3) is a cargo ship in service with the Argentine Navy since 1978, capable of transporting bulk cargo, live cattle, and containers. She is the second ship in the Argentine Navy to bear the name of the Beagle Channel in the south of Tierra del Fuego.

Design 
Canal Beagle (B-3) is one of three  cargo ships ordered by the Argentine Navy in 1975, designed and built by the Argentine Príncipe, Menghi y Penco shipyard, at Buenos Aires, Argentina. The design is optimised for Patagonic coastal service.

Canal Beagle has a steel hull and the superstructure at the stern, with a single mast and a single funnel atop, behind the bridge; the cargo area is located in the middle of the ship and three “Liebherr” cranes serve the three holds, one each.

History 

With the ships then operating with “Naval Transport Service” ( Servicio de Transportes Navales) approaching obsolescence, the Argentine Navy was authorized (via decree 3/10/1975) to order the local construction of three cargo ships for the southern coastal service. The ships, with hull optimised for Patagonic coastal service, were designed and built by the Argentine Príncipe, Menghi y Penco shipyard, at Buenos Aires, Argentina, in the late 1970s and are denominated the Costa Sur-class.

Canal Beagle, the first ship in her class, was laid down on 10 January 1977 and launched on 19 October 1977. She was commissioned on 29 April 1978 and assigned to the Argentine Navy’s Naval Transport Service with pennant number B-3.

In addition to coastal and riverine activities in Argentina, Canal Beagle also operated overseas. In 1989, Canal Beagle helped remove oil from the shipwreck of the polar transport , in an effort to reduce pollution in the Antarctic waters. 
In 1992 she transported to the Gulf of Fonseca, Honduras, the four Baradero-class patrol boats used under United Nations mandate ONUCA.

In 2005, Canal Beagle was part of the naval deployment contributing to the security of the 4th Summit of the Americas ( IV Cumbre de las Américas) hold in the Argentine city of Mar del Plata.

Starting in late 2007, she took part in the Argentine Antarctic Program replacing the icebreaker  in the resupply of the Argentine bases in Argentine Antarctica.

The ship remained active as of 2022, participating in an exercise off the coast of Mar del Plata with other Argentine naval units.

Footnotes

References

Notes

Bibliography

Further reading

External links 
 Argentine Navy official site – Transportes Clase “COSTA SUR” (accessed 2017-01-18)
 Histarmar website – COMANDO DE TRANSPORTES NAVALES – Transportes Navales desde 1970 hasta ahora (accessed 2017-01-18)
 Histarmar website – FLOTA DE MAR 2015 (accessed 2017-01-18)

Costa Sur class cargo ships
Transports of the Argentine Navy
Ships built in Argentina
1977 ships